Miruwa is the name of Ward Number 2 in Pokhara Metropolitan City in Nepal. The famous Bindhyabasini temple is located in this ward.

References

Wards of Pokhara